Alexander Tuschinski (born October 28, 1988, Stuttgart, West Germany) is a German film director, film producer, writer, actor and musician. Internationally, he is best known for his feature films which have won awards at various film festivals, as well as his academic writing on the early works of Tinto Brass. Notably, his research into, and interest in, Brass's work on Caligula was examined in his feature documentary Mission: Caligula. At the documentary's premiere, Penthouse announced plans to work with Tuschinski on a new cut of Caligula that aims to restore and finish Brass's original version of the film. Though 85 minutes of his original workprint will be used, it remains unclear if Brass himself will be involved in finishing the film's edit.

Life
Alexander Tuschinski attended school in Stuttgart, Germany, and originally wanted to study physics after finishing school in 2008. However, he changed his mind shortly before enrolling at university realizing that film was his main passion, and instead started studying Audiovisual Media at Hochschule der Medien. Graduating 2011 as a Bachelor of Engineering in Audiovisual Media, he enrolled at University of Stuttgart afterwards to study history and literature, graduating in 2014 with his second degree as a Bachelor of Arts. He continues pursuing a master's degree there. He produces his works parallel to his studies.

Prior to 2008, Tuschinski had already produced short videos that he published on YouTube. He is friends with Tinto Brass and Hugo Niebeling whose 1960s films influence his cinematic style. He considers them his "mentors".

Works

Films

Feature films
For Tuschinski, his films Menschenliebe, Timeless and a planned upcoming project called Revolution! form an informal Trilogy of Rebellion: The films are independent of each other, but feature similar themes, styles and the same two main characters (Arnold and Konstantin). The scope of the topics they address increases with each instalment: While Menschenliebe deals mostly with relationships between individuals, Timeless addresses topics from all aspects of society. Break-Up is a smaller film, independent of the trilogy, but featuring the character of Arnold and some references to the other films.   As of 2015, Tuschinski considers Timeless "by far" his best film.

Short films

Music videos

Writing

Academic writing/Film Restoration
Tuschinski has been called an "encyclopledic Brass expert" on Caligula.  Tuschinski  wrote an essay on Tinto Brass' film The Key. In 2012, Tuschinski restored some of Brass' 1960s films using material from the director's private archive. They were later screened at a retrospective in Hollywood.

In 2018, at the premiere for his documentary  Mission: Caligula, Tuschinski made a joint announcement with Penthouse regarding a new cut of Caligula. The project aims to restore and finish Tinto Brass's version of the film. Brass was dismissed by Penthouse in post-production before he could complete his cut of the film. In July 2018, Tuschinski released Mission: Caligula on Vimeo.

Other writing
Tuschinski's first novel "Das Fahrzeug" was published in Germany in 2011.

Music
Tuschinski frequently composes and performs songs and instrumental music for his own films. He occasionally performs his songs live on stage, often combined with comedy routines.

In 2014, Tuschinski published an album featuring classical music recorded on synthesizer and vocoder.

Filmmaking style

General description

Alexander Tuschinski's films have been compared to "the early works of Woody Allen". He uses an impressionistic camera- and editing-style that is considered experimental by some. His films frequently employ classical music with scenes edited to the rhythm and the structure of the music, as well as satirical songs that are often used to progress the story.

Visual language

Tuschinski himself uses an analogy to language when describing his approach to cinematography and editing, calling different shots nouns (e.g. shots showing an object / a person without any additional intention than showing it, like establishing shots), verbs (shots used to depict an action or movement) or adjectives (shots "describing" things, like quick cut-aways and details), comparing regular visual rules of filmmaking to classical literature, while his way of filming is rather like slam poetry.

In almost all of Tuschinski's films, him and Matthias Kirste share the cinematographer-credit. When Tuschinski is acting, Kirste operates the camera, and when Tuschinski is not seen in the frame, he often operates the camera himself. Sebastian B. is often cast as the lead actor in Tuschinski's films.

Awards (excerpt)

 Golden Pelican (for Gold): Mykonos Biennale 2015.
 Best Director (for Break-Up): Maverick Movie Awards 2014.
 Best Director (for Menschenliebe): California Film Awards 2011.
 Best New Filmmaker: Take One Awards 2012.
 Best Foreign Film (Break-Up): American Movie Awards 2014.
 Best Comedy (for Menschenliebe): Hollywood Reel Independent Film Festival 2011.
 Best International Film (for Break-Up): Hollywood Reel Independent Film Festival 2015.
 Gold Medal for Excellence (for Menschenliebe): Park City Film Music Festival 2011.
 Best New Director (nominated, for Menschenliebe): Action on Film International Film Festival 2011.
 Best Foreign Film (for Menschenliebe): Nevada International Film Festival 2011.
 Special Jury Award (for Menschenliebe): Honolulu Film Awards 2012.
 Best Comedy Film – Silver Remi Award (for Break-Up): WorldFest-Houston International Film Festival 2014.
 Best Editing (for Break-Up): Oregon Independent Film Festival 2014.
 Best Foreign Feature (for Break-Up): Oregon Independent Film Festival 2014.
 Best Short <5 min (for Hollow Date): Berlin Independent Film Festival 2013.
 Silver Ace Award (for Mutant Calculator): Las Vegas Film Festival 2011.

Additionally, Tuschinski's documentary Quasicrystal Research was selected to play during the Australian National Science Week in 2012, being shown in 400 venues around Australia during that week.

References

External links 

Take One Magazine: Interview with Alexander Tuschinski.

German male film actors
Film people from Stuttgart
1988 births
Living people
Male actors from Stuttgart
University of Stuttgart alumni